The finals and the qualifying heats of the Women's 200 metres Backstroke event at the 1998 European Short Course Swimming Championships were held on the first day of the competition, on Friday 11 December 1998 in Sheffield, England.

Finals

Qualifying Heats

See also
1996 Women's Olympic Games 200m Backstroke
1997 Women's World SC Championships 200m Backstroke
1997 Women's European LC Championships 200m Backstroke
1998 Women's World LC Championships 200m Backstroke
2000 Women's Olympic Games 100m Backstroke

References
 Results

B
E
1998 in women's swimming